This is a list of public art in Pembrokeshire, Wales. This list applies only to works of public art and monuments on permanent display in an outdoor public space and does not, for example, include artworks in museums.

Carew

Carn Menyn

Coastline

Fishguard

Haverfordwest

Lampeter Velfrey

Little Newcastle

Milford Haven

Narberth

Nevern

Pembroke

Pembroke Dock

St Davids

Tenby

References

Pembrokeshire
Pembrokeshire